Dry Fork, Virginia may refer to:
Dry Fork, Bland County, Virginia
Dry Fork, Pittsylvania County, Virginia